James Holmes Carson Jr. (February 14, 1935 – August 28, 2015) was an American lawyer and politician. He was appointed North Carolina Attorney General on August 26, 1974, by Governor James E. Holshouser, Jr. after Robert Burren Morgan resigned to devote his attention to a run for the U.S. Senate. Carson then ran in a special election for Attorney General, which he lost to Democrat Rufus L. Edmisten.

Carson also served two terms in the North Carolina House of Representatives, serving the 36th district, in Mecklenburg County. He died of myelodysplastic syndrome on August 28, 2015.

References 

North Carolina Attorneys General
Deaths from myelodysplastic syndrome
Members of the North Carolina House of Representatives
1935 births
2015 deaths